Noel or Noël has been in use as both a given name and a surname since the 12th century. It has been traditionally given to children born over the Christmas period, and most early baptisms of the name took place in December or early January. The name Noel has been given to both boys and girls on this holiday since the Middle Ages. According to the US Social Security Administration, girls named Noel ranked #587 in popularity in 1987. The diaeresis (¨) can be used over the e and is used when there are two vowels next to one another that should be pronounced as separate syllables instead of a diphthong. It should not be confused with the umlaut (also two dots), a diacritical mark that represents a change in the pronunciation of the letter. Other nicknames and modern variations for girls named Noel are: Noele, Noeline, Nowell, Noela, Noell, Noella, Noelene, Noeleen, and the French specific feminine spelling distinguished by adding the "le" to the ending of the name, (Noelle).

Noel derives from the old French Noël "Christmas", a variant (and later a replacement) of nael, which itself derives from the Latin natalis "birth". The term natalis dies (birth day) was long used in Church Latin in reference to the birthday of Christ—or in other words: Christmas. In modern English, a Noel can also be used to refer to a Christmas carol.

People
Noël (singer), American disco singer
Noel Agazarian (1916–1941), British pilot
Noel Barrionuevo (b. 1984), Argentine female professional field hockey player and Olympian
Noel Bauldeweyn (c. 1480–1513), Franco-Flemish composer
Noel Blanc (b. 1938), American voice actor, son of Mel Blanc
Noel Cabangon (b. 1963), Filipino singer
Noel Chavasse (1884–1917), British medical officer and decorated hero
Noel Clarke (b. 1975), English actor and writer
Noël Coward (1899–1973), British actor, playwright, and popular music composer
Noel Devine (b. 1988), American football player
Noel Dyson (1916–1995), British actress
Noel Edmonds (b. 1948), British television presenter and DJ
Noel Emmanuel (b. 1960), 6th Bishop of Trincomalee
Noel Fielding (b. 1973), British comedian and television actor
Noel Fisher (b. 1984), Canadian actor 
Noel Francis (c. 1906–1959), American Actress
Noel Gallagher (b. 1967), English musician
Noel V. Ginnity (fl. 1957-2020's), Irish comedian
Noël Godin (b. 1945), Belgian writer
Noel Harrison (1934–2013), British actor and singer
Noel Hood (1909–1979), British actress
Noel Jenke (1946–2020), American football player
Noel King (b. 1956), Republic of Ireland U-21s football manager
Noel LaMontagne (b. 1977), American football player
Noel Langley (1911–1980), South African novelist, screenwriter and director
Noël Leslie, Countess of Rothes (b. 1878), heroine of the Titanic disaster
Noël Martin (1959–2020), British activist and neo-Nazi attack victim
Noel Neill (1920–2016), American actress 
Noel Pagan or Noel, American freestyle musician
Noel Paul Stookey (b. 1937), American folk musician
Noel Redding (1945–2003), English guitarist and bassist
Noël Regney (1922–2002), French songwriter
Noel Rosa (1910–1937), Brazilian songwriter and musician
 Noel Rosal (b. 1964), Filipino politician
Noel Stanton (1926–2009), founder of the Jesus Army
Noel Stockdale (1920–2004), English businessman
Noel Streatfeild (1895–1986), British author (Ballet Shoes)
Noel Sullivan (b. 1980), Welsh singer and actor
Noel Toy (1918–2003), Actress
Noel Thatcher, British paralympic athlete
Noel Walsh  (1935–2020), Irish Gaelic footballer, administrator, selector, manager and member of the Defence Forces
Noel Whelan (b. 1974), English professional footballer
Noël Wells (b. 1986), American comedian and actress 
Noel Wimalasena (1914–1994), Sri Lankan Sinhala diplomat, 1st Governor of Sabaragamuwa Province, Sri Lanka
María Noel (b. 1943), Uruguayan model and actress

Fictional characters
Noël (comics), a character and comics series by André Franquin
Noel Gruber a character in the musical Ride  the Cyclone
Noel (mermaid), in the manga and anime series Mermaid Melody Pichi Pichi Pitch
Noel K. Ehrlichkeit, in the Triangle Heart video game
Noel Vermillion in the fighting game series BlazBlue
Noel Kreiss, from the video game Final Fantasy XIII-2
Noël Kannagi, from the anime Sora No Woto
Noël Takao, from the Super Sentai series Lupinranger VS Patranger
Noel Shempsky, in the tv show Frasier
Noel Seeker, in the video game series The Legend of Heroes: Trails to Azure and others

In names for Santa Claus
Père Noël, the French equivalent to Santa Claus, literally translated "Father Christmas"
Papá Noel, the Spanish and Latin American equivalent
Pare Noel, the Catalan-speaking regions' equivalent
Papai Noel, the Brazilian equivalent
Baba Noel, the Chaldean and Arabic equivalent

See also
Noelle

References

French masculine given names
Scottish given names
English-language unisex given names
English masculine given names
English feminine given names